Emilio Sommariva (Lodi, 1883 – Milan, 1956) was an Italian painter and photographer.

Biography
Sommariva was born in Lodi the son of Luigi, amateur painter and photograph employee. His family moved to Milanwhile he was an infant, and by 1897, age 14 years; Sommariva began to attend classes at the Brera Academy, including Ornato's evening classes. He attended Angelo Comolli’s School of Decoration from 1898 to 1899, but due to financial difficulties, he had to abandon studies. He was then employed as a photographer by the Compagnia Continentale Brunt & C. foundry and subsequently by the Ganzini photographic studio. A few months later in 1902 he opened his own atelier in Viale Monforte (now Viale Pavia) with a wide terrace meant for portrait posing, and during the following years he moved to Via Paolo and Via Montenapoleone.

With some difficulty Sommariva eventually became established as a portraitist who photographed the intelligentsia of the day. He was employed not only as a portraitist, but as a photographer of their works by artists such as Umberto Boccioni, Aroldo Bonzagni, Carlo Carrà and other futurists like Gaetano Previati and Adolfo Wildt.

He also made reproductions of works of art, took industrial photographs, architectural and landscape photographs. His fame was sealed by the recognition received at the 1911 Esposizione Internazionale di Fotografia Artistica e Scientifica di Roma (Comitato delle Feste gold medal) and the Turin Esposizione e Concorso Internazionale di Fotografia (diploma of honour). In 1922 he made a name for himself on the international scene by winning the first prize at the International Exhibition of Professional Artistic Photography in London. In the 1920s he also began to exhibit as a painter: he participated in the Brera Biennale in 1925, in the Esposizione Internazionale d’Arte di Venezia in 1926 and in the exhibitions held by the Permanente in Milan the following decade. During this period he executed numerous landscapes inspired by the foothills of the Alps in Lombardy and Piedmont where he went during his frequent stays at the family villa at Lanzo d’Intelvi.

In 1938, after his refusal to enrol in the fascist party, his patent of photographer is withdrawed. In the last air raid over Milan, in 1943, Sommariva loses his house and study, but the most of the original prints and plates are spared.

A retrospective of his extensive pictorial output was held at the Galleria Ranzini, Milan, in 1950.

His archives, documents and photographs, were purchased from his heirs in 1979 and are now part of the Braidense Library. The collection includes 2,814 prints and about 50,000 negatives mostly on glass, as well as ten manuscripts, mostly inventory and address books, and other documents.

References

Sources
 Laura Casone, Emilio Sommariva, online catalogue Artgate by Fondazione Cariplo, 2010, CC BY-SA (source for the first revision of this article).

Other projects

19th-century Italian painters
Italian male painters
20th-century Italian painters
Painters from Milan
Italian landscape painters
1883 births
1956 deaths
19th-century Italian male artists
20th-century Italian male artists